The Africa Men's Sevens, formerly the Africa Cup Sevens, is an annual rugby sevens tournament involving African nations, organised by Rugby Africa. Since 2013 the event has  been contested on an annual basis. 

The tournament is also acts as a qualifying event for the Rugby World Cup Sevens and Olympic Rugby Sevens as required.

Results by year
Winners and runners-up for official Rugby Africa and IRB (WR) sevens tournaments:

Team Records

See also

Africa Cup
Africa Women's Sevens

References

 
Rugby sevens competitions in Africa
2013 establishments in Africa